Jillian Balow is an American politician who was appointed as the Virginia superintendent of public instruction in January 2022. She resigned from the position in March 2023. From 2014 to January 2022, she was the Wyoming superintendent of public instruction.

Career 
Balow was a division administrator in the Wyoming Department of Family Services.

Balow was president of the Council of Chief State School Officers. A Republican, she was elected as the Wyoming Superintendent of Public Instruction in 2014, winning 61% of the vote against Democrat Mike Ceballos. During her 2014 campaign, she opposed the Common Core initiatives. Balow ran unopposed in 2018. Her last day as the Wyoming superintendent was January 16, 2022.

In January 2022, Balow was appointed by governor Glenn Youngkin as the Virginia superintendent of public instruction. She succeeded acting Virginia superintendent Rosa Atkins.

On March 1, 2023, Balow announced her resignation as Virginia's Superintendent of Public Instruction, effective March 9th.  Balow's tenure at VDOE was marked with high-profile fights over issues including revised state standards for history education and the treatment of transgender students in schools.

References

Citations

Bibliography 

1970 births
21st-century American women politicians
21st-century American politicians
Living people
School superintendents in Virginia
Superintendents of Public Instruction of Wyoming
Virginia Republicans
Women in Virginia politics
Women in Wyoming politics
Wyoming Republicans